Lappa may refer to:

Lappa, Queensland, a village in the Shire of Mareeba, North Queensland, Australia, also known as Lappa Lappa and Lappa Junction
Lappa, Rethymno, a municipal unit in the Rethymno regional unit, Greece
Lappa (Crete), an ancient town of Crete, Greece
Lappa (see), a bishopric based at the ancient town in Crete
A plant, Arctium lappa, also called greater burdock
Lappa, a garment worn by men and women in Africa

See also 
Lappas, a village in the municipal unit Larissos, in Achaea, Greece